Fish out of water is an idiom used to refer to a person who is in unfamiliar, and often uncomfortable, surroundings.

Fish out of water may also refer to:

Film and television
 Fish Out of Water (1993 film), a Danish film
 Fish Out of Water (2009 film), a documentary
 Fish Out of Water, a character in the 2005 film Chicken Little
 "Fish Out of Water", a 2011 episode of Fish Hooks
 "Fish Out of Water" (BoJack Horseman), a 2016 episode of BoJack Horseman
 "A Fish out of Water" (Family Guy), a 2001 episode of Family Guy

Music
 Fish Out of Water (Chris Squire album), 1975
 Fish Out of Water (Charles Lloyd album), 1990
 Fish Out of Water (Ash Grunwald album), 2008
 "Fish Out of Water", a song by Tears for Fears from Elemental, 1993
 "Fish Out of Water" (One Minute Silence song), 2000
 "Fish Out of Water", a song by OPM on Menace to Sobriety, 2000
 "Fish Out Of Water", a song by Nicola Roberts on Cinderella's Eyes, 2011
 "Fish Out Of Water", a song by Mudvayne from The New Game, 2008

Other uses
 A Fish out of Water (book), a 1961 children's book by Helen Palmer Geisel
 A Fish in the Water, a memoir of Peruvian writer Mario Vargas Llosa, originally published as El pez en el agua in 1993
 Fish Out of Water (video game), released in 2013

See also
 Fish Outta Water, 2009 debut album of Chali 2na